Hiranandani Estate is an upmarket condominium-style township built by the Hiranandani Group in the city of Thane, a part of the Mumbai Metropolitan Area in Maharashtra. It is accessible via Ghodbunder Road which connects the Eastern Express Highway to the western suburbs of Borivali, Kandivali, and Mira Road. 

Hiranandani Group has developed 2.6 million square feet of commercial real estate space in the Hiranandani Estate township across 350 acres on Ghodbunder Road, Thane. 

The township has a distinctive skyline which stands out in comparison to buildings from neighbouring complexes, particularly because of the heavy usage of Art Deco and Neoclassical architectural influences. Designed to be self-sufficient, the township includes the Hiranandani Hospital, the Hiranandani Foundation School (ICSE), and an exclusive club house along with other cafes, restaurants, ATMS, and its own transportation system connecting the township to Thane railway station. The township is also famous for its wide roads, broad pavements and landscaping. 

The township is also home to the Hiranandani Business Park Thane which houses numerous BPOs and MNCs.
The estate also houses the upmarket highstreet shopping center named The Walk which has shops from both domestic as well as international brands and has many restaurants from the likes of Pizza Hut and KFC to other Indian brands.
Recently, Rodas Enclave, a gated community of 18 storied residential buildings has come up in the northeastern corner.

Governance
Residents form co-operative societies to take care of issues related to utilities and aesthetics, resolve neighbourly disputes and hold events on festivals or other occasions. The Hiranandani Estate Residents Welfare Association (HERWA) serves as a town council and deals with issues related to the township. HERWA is further divided into sub-committees, such as the bus committee. The township also has its own newspaper - "Hiranandani Estate News" - which is published on a monthly basis. 

The Hiranandani Estate Action Forum was created recently to voice the concerns of residents regarding the lack of security within the township as well as to deal with other issues such as forest land encroachment, water supply, development of a community centre, etc. The Forum recently staged a protest rally to bring these issues to the developer's notice. Since then, the forum has discussed these issues with the developer of the township, and hopes to resolve them as soon as possible. Members of the forum meet every Sunday from 9AM to 10AM at the Club House.

Hiranandani Estate prohibits any religious buildings as the developer and the residents want to live in a secular, cosmopolitan neighbourhood.

Transportation

HERWA also has a bus committee which manages and operates bus service from Hiranandani Estate Sales Gallery to Kopri, Thane East. This bus service is reserved for residents and employees of companies with offices within Hiranandani Estate. 

BEST operates two buses which connect Hiranandani Estate to other parts of Mumbai. These are: 

1) A-13 Express

Hiranandani Estate to Backbay Depot

This service is operated using airconditioned King Long buses and is used by commuters who travel to localities in South Mumbai.

The route schedule for this service can be found at the BEST website.

2) 492 Ltd

Waghbil to SEEPZ via Hiranandani Estate

This service is used by commuters who wish to travel to Powai, SEEPZ, or Andheri (E).

Hospitals
Hiranandai Estates township has a world class hospital called "Hiranandani Hospital" within its beautiful campus.

References

External links

 Developer's official website

Neighbourhoods in Thane
Geography of Thane
Year of establishment missing